The year 1686 in science and technology involved some significant events.

Astronomy
 Gottfried Kirch notices that Chi Cygni's brightness varies.

Biology
 John Ray begins publication of his Historia Plantarum, including the first biological definition of the term species; also his edition of Francis Willughby's Historia Piscum.

Geology
 Edmund Halley establishes the relationship between barometric pressure and height above sea level.

Meteorology
 Edmund Halley presents a systematic study of the trade winds and monsoons and identifies solar heating as the cause of atmospheric motions.

Physics
 Isaac Newton uses a fixed length pendulum with weights of varying composition to test the weak equivalence principle to 1 part in 1000.

Births
 February 10 – Jan Frederik Gronovius, Dutch botanist (died 1762)
 May 24 – Gabriel Fahrenheit, physicist and inventor (died 1736)
 July 6 – Antoine de Jussieu, French naturalist (died 1758)
 October (possible date) – John Machin, English mathematician (died 1751)

Deaths
 May 11 – Otto von Guericke, German physicist (born 1602)
 November 25 (NS December 5) – Nicolas Steno, Danish pioneer geologist (born 1638)

References

 
17th century in science
1680s in science